Slavka Kohout (born December 14, 1932) is an American figure skating coach and former competitor, best known for coaching 5-time U.S. Champion Janet Lynn throughout her entire competitive career.

Career 
As a skater, Kohout was twice the Midwestern sectional senior ladies champion, and she won the bronze medal in the 1950 U.S. junior ladies championships.  After turning professional, she was manager and head coach at the Wagon Wheel Ice Palace in Rockton, Illinois for 17 years.  During that period, the Wagon Wheel rink—part of a larger resort complex—was one of the top figure skating training centers in the United States.  Kohout coached not only Lynn but also 3-time U.S. champion Gordon McKellen, several other international competitors, and other skaters who have gone on to become prominent coaches or skating judges, such as Shepherd Clark, The 2017, 2018, 2019 World Figure & Fancy Skating Champion of World Figure Sport / "WFS", at which Kohout was an official, an honoree, and a 2015 World Figure Sport Hall of Fame inductee in Lake Placid, NY.

Slavka Kohout was inducted into the United States Figure Skating Hall of Fame in 2002.

Personal 

Kohout left Wagon Wheel when she married Dick Button in 1973.  They had children Emily and Edward together, but have since divorced.  In later years, Kohout continued to coach in the New York City area.

References

 Biography in 2002 U.S. Figure Skating Championships program booklet.
 Scott Hamilton, Landing It.  .
 Janet Lynn, Peace + Love.  .

American figure skating coaches
American female single skaters
Female sports coaches
Living people
People from Rockton, Illinois
1932 births
21st-century American women